Beverly Hills, California is one of the most affluent cities in the world, and is in the western part of Los Angeles County, California, United States.

Beverly Hills may also refer to:

Places

U.S.
 Beverly Hills, a neighborhood in Vallejo, California
 Beverly Hills, Florida
 Beverly Hills, Chicago, Illinois
 Beverly Hills, Baltimore, Maryland, a neighborhood
 Beverly Hills, Michigan
 Beverly Hills, Missouri
 Beverly Hills, Texas
 Beverly Hills, Marion County, West Virginia
 Beverly Hills, a neighborhood in Huntington, West Virginia

Other countries
 Beverly Hills, Cebu City, a subdivision of Cebu City, Philippines
 Beverly Hill (Hong Kong), Happy Valley, Hong Kong, a private residential estate in Happy Valley, Hong Kong
 The Beverly Hills, a private residential estate in Tai Po, Hong Kong
 Beverly Hills, Jamaica, Kingston, Jamaica
 Beverly Hills, New South Wales, a suburb of Sydney, Australia
 Beverley Hills, Western Cape, South Africa

Television series
 Beverly Hills, 90210, an American teen drama produced by Aaron Spelling
 Beverly Hills Teens, an American animated children's television program
 The Beverly Hillbillies, an American sitcom, 1962 to 1971

Other uses
 Beverly Hills (actress) (born 1966), British actress
 Beverly Hills Line, a suburban line of the Pacific Electric Railway
 Beverly Boulevard (SEPTA station), trolley line station in Upper Darby, Pennsylvania, USA once known as Beverly Hills
 "Beverly Hills" (song), the first single by Weezer from their fifth album Make Believe
 Beverly Hills Supper Club fire, Southgate, Kentucky; 1977
 Monica Beverly Hillz, American drag queen
 Anastasia Beverly Hills, cosmetics company

See also
Beverly Hill, Texas, an unincorporated community